Bamna is an Upazila of Barguna District in the Division of Barisal, Bangladesh.

Demographics

According to the 2011 Bangladesh census, Bamna Upazila had 19,537 households and a population of 79,564, 9.7% of whom lived in urban areas. 9.6% of the population was under the age of 5. The literacy rate (age 7 and over) was 61.1%, compared to the national average of 51.8%.

Administration
Bamna Upazila is divided into four union parishads: Bamna, Bukabunia, Dauatola, and Ramna. The union parishads are subdivided into 39 mauzas and 49 villages.

See also
Upazilas of Bangladesh
Districts of Bangladesh
Divisions of Bangladesh

References

Upazilas of Barguna District